Bad Boys for Life is the soundtrack to Adil El Arbi and Bilall Fallah's 2020 film Bad Boys for Life. It was released on January 17, 2020 via We the Best Music Group/Epic Records, and consists of ten tracks. Its lead single, "Ritmo (Bad Boys for Life)" performed by the Black Eyed Peas and J Balvin, was released on October 11, 2019.

Track listing

Charts

Weekly charts

Year-end charts

References

2020 soundtrack albums
2020s film soundtrack albums
Action film soundtracks
Comedy film soundtracks
Hip hop soundtracks
Bad Boys (franchise)
Epic Records soundtracks
Albums produced by Lil Jon
Albums produced by will.i.am